Howz-e Galurshur (also Romanized as Ḩowẕ-e Galūrshūr; also known as Ḩowẕ-e Galūshūr and Hauz-i Galūshūr) is a village in Dokuheh Rural District, Seh Qaleh District, Sarayan County, South Khorasan Province, Iran. At the 2006 census, its population was 26, in 4 families.

References 

Populated places in Sarayan County